Hadran is a short prayer recited upon the completion of study of a tractate of the Talmud or a Seder of Mishnah. It is also the name of the scholarly discourse delivered at a siyum masechet, the ceremony celebrating the completion of study of a Talmudic tractate.

Etymology
Hadran is an Aramaic word used in the Talmud. It is the first word of a short prayer that appears at the end of each tractate. The prayer reads:

According to the Raavad, a 12th-century Talmudic commentator, the word hadran comes from the Aramaic root , which is similar to the Hebrew root  ('return' or 'review'). Thus, the prayer expresses the learner's desire to return to and review the tractate again in the future. According to Rabbi Chaim ben Betzalel, author of Sefer HaChaim, the word hadran is similar to the Hebrew root H-D-R ("glory"), and thus speaks of the Talmud as being "our glory". In his words: "Since the Talmud is glorious only when studied by Jews, and Israel itself is distinguished precisely by its adherence to the Oral Torah, which separates it from the nations, we therefore are accustomed to declare at the completion of a tractate that 'our glory is on you, and your glory is on us'". Other observers point out this alternative meaning.

Recital
The hadran is said aloud at a siyum celebrating the completion of study of a Talmudic tractate. The one who has studied the tractate leaves aside a small portion at the end of the text to learn at the siyum. After studying this portion aloud, the person recites the hadran three times. If a group of students is completing a tractate, their principal or teacher learns the last portion of the tractate aloud and they all recite the hadran together three times.

The wording of the hadran is an expression of love and friendship, as if the tractate has become the learner's friend since he has studied it, and he longs to be reunited with it. According to Yoma Tova LeRabbanan, the repetition of the hadran three times is a segulah (propitious remedy) for remembering what one has learned.

The learner or learners also recite a short passage describing Rav Papa and his ten sons, which is also considered a protection against forgetting one's learning.

Discourse
It is customary for a scholar to deliver a Talmudic discourse at a siyum being made on the completion of a tractate. This discourse is also called a hadran. The speaker may be the one completing the tractate or another honored guest. This discourse connects the end of the tractate with its beginning, or with the beginning of the next tractate in sequence, using pilpul (incisive analysis) to connect the ideas in the two places.

A special literature of hadran pilpul began appearing at the beginning of the 18th century. Since then, numerous collections of hadran discourses have been published. Many leading rabbis who opposed pilpul criticized its use in the hadran.

At the 5th Siyum HaShas of Daf Yomi in Tel Aviv in 1960, Rabbi Yosef Shlomo Kahaneman, the Ponovezher Rav, delivered a hadran for nearly two hours. At the age of 17, Rabbi Yitzchak Yaacov Reines delivered a hadran that lasted three days at a Siyum HaShas celebrated by the Chevras Shas (Shas Society) of his hometown.

References

External links
Last page of Tractate Berakhot with hadran printed after text
"The Completion of the Babylonian Talmud, Daf Yomi"

Talmud
Aramaic words and phrases
Torah study
Aramaic words and phrases in Jewish prayers and blessings